The 1939 National League Division One was an eleventh and unfinished season of the highest tier of motorcycle speedway in Great Britain.

Summary
Southampton Saints had moved up from Division Two and Bristol Bulldogs moved back down after just one season.

Belle Vue Aces were leading the championship ahead of Wimbledon Dons when the league was abandoned due to the outbreak of World War II .

Table at the outbreak of war

Top Ten Riders at the outbreak of war

National Trophy
The 1939 National Trophy was the ninth edition of the Knockout Cup. Wembley and Belle Vue were declared joint winners following the abandonment of the final fixture due to the outbreak of the war.

Qualifying rounds
Sheffield Tigers won the Division Two final and therefore secured a place in the quarter finals.

Quarterfinals

Semifinals

Final

List of United Kingdom Speedway League Champions
Knockout Cup (speedway)

References

Speedway National League
1939 in speedway
1939 in British motorsport